Real Grupo de Cultura Covadonga is a Spanish basketball team based in Gijón, Asturias. It currently plays in Liga EBA.

History
In its first years, the club was quarterfinalist of the Copa del Rey (1949, 1950 and 1951). During the 1960s and the 1970s the team played in tiers 2 and 3, until 1982 when due to financial problems it sold its spot to recently founded Gijón Baloncesto.

It came back to the national divisions in 1997, when it promoted to Liga EBA. Nowadays, Grupo Covadonga alternates seasons between this league and Primera División de Baloncesto.

Season by season

References

External links
Basketball section at RGCC website 
Profile at Asturcesto 

Grupo
Basketball
Former Liga EBA teams